Europe is an album by the Bloomington, Indiana folk punk duo Ghost Mice.

Track listing

2006 albums
Ghost Mice albums